Tihemetsa is a small borough in Saarde Parish, Pärnu County in southern Estonia. Tihemetsa is home to Voltveti manor.

References 

Boroughs and small boroughs in Estonia
Kreis Pernau